George N. Hembree (1893 – May 17, 1945) was an American football, basketball and baseball coach. He served as the head football coach at Eastern Kentucky University from 1920 to 1929 He also served as EKU's head men's basketball coach and baseball coach, in addition to being a faculty member. A major in the United States Army Air Forces during World War II, Hembree died after being hit by a truck in May 1945.

References

External links
 

1893 births
1945 deaths
Eastern Kentucky Colonels football coaches
Eastern Kentucky Colonels men's basketball coaches
Eastern Kentucky Colonels baseball coaches
Eastern Kentucky Colonels athletic directors
United States Army Air Forces personnel of World War II
United States Army Air Forces officers
Road incident deaths in Texas
Truck road incident deaths